Johnsons Air was an airline registered in Ghana and based at Kotoka International Airport in Accra, Ghana. Founded in 1996 by Farzin Azima, it operated ad hoc cargo services. The airline was one of eight airlines blacklisted in Belgium in 2005 due to operational safety concerns. In October 2006, the ban was extended to include all European Union communities. Johnsons Air meanwhile ceased operations.

Fleet 
As of March 2007 the Johnsons Air fleet consisted of the following aircraft:

3 Douglas DC-8-63CF

References 

Defunct airlines of Ghana
Ghanaian companies established in 1996
Airlines established in 1996
Airlines disestablished in 2008
Companies based in Accra